Betlanovce is a village and municipality in the Spišská Nová Ves District in the Košice Region of central-eastern Slovakia.

History
The name "Terra Bethlem", the earth of Bethlem, was mentioned as early as 1260 in a written document. In historical records the village itself was first mentioned in 1311 as "villa Bethlem", meaning a village belonging to Bethlem.

The village was once part of the County of the Ten Lance-bearers (Sedes X lanceatorum), a historical autonomous administrative unit within the wider Spiš county. The County of the Ten Lance-bearers existed between the 12th century and 1802, when it merged with the Spiš county proper. Between 1725 and 1803 this institution resided in Betlanovce.

Geography
The village lies at an altitude of 546 metres and covers an area of 10.124 km².
It has a population of about 638 people.

Cultural monuments
 Renaissance manor house of the Thurzó family

Genealogical resources

The records for genealogical research are available at the state archive "Statny Archiv in Levoca, Slovakia"

 Roman Catholic church records (births/marriages/deaths): 1703-1903 (parish B)
 Lutheran church records (births/marriages/deaths): 1710-1895 (parish B)

See also
 List of municipalities and towns in Slovakia

References

External links
http://en.e-obce.sk/obec/betlanovce/betlanovce.html
http://www.betlanovce.sk
Surnames of living people in Betlanovce

Villages and municipalities in Spišská Nová Ves District